The Henry Taubman House is a historic residence located in Maquoketa, Iowa, United States.  This Greek Revival house represents the earliest extant houses in Maquoketa that were built during its early growth period.  Built in 1854, the two-story frame house features a gable roof,  cornice returns, pilasters, and a single-story wing on the east side.  This house is one of five left in Maquoketa in the Greek Revival style.  It was listed on the National Register of Historic Places in 1991.

References

Houses completed in 1854
Greek Revival houses in Iowa
Houses in Maquoketa, Iowa
National Register of Historic Places in Jackson County, Iowa
Houses on the National Register of Historic Places in Iowa